Latin Extended-A is a Unicode block and is the third block of the Unicode standard. It encodes Latin letters from the Latin ISO character sets other than Latin-1 (which is already encoded in the Latin-1 Supplement block) and also legacy characters from the ISO 6937 standard.

The Latin Extended-A block has been in the Unicode Standard since version 1.0, with its entire character repertoire, except for the Latin Small Letter Long S, which was added during unification with ISO 10646 in version 1.1. Its block name in Unicode 1.0 was European Latin.

Character table

Subheadings
The Latin Extended-A block contains only two subheadings: European Latin and Deprecated letter.

European Latin
The European Latin subheading contains all but one character in the Latin Extended-A block. It is populated with accented and variant majuscule and minuscule Latin letters for writing mostly eastern European languages.

Deprecated letter
The Deprecated letter subheading contains a single character, Latin Small Letter N Preceded by Apostrophe, which was included for compatibility with the ISO/IEC 6937 standard. It was deprecated as of Unicode version 5.2.0, with the comment that “U+0149  LATIN SMALL LETTER N PRECEDED BY APOSTROPHE” was encoded for use in Afrikaans.  The  character  is  deprecated,  and  its  use  is  strongly  discouraged. In  nearly  all cases it is better represented by a sequence of an apostrophe followed by “n”: ’n.

Table

Compact table

History
The following Unicode-related documents record the purpose and process of defining specific characters in the Latin Extended-A block:

See also 
Phonetic symbols in Unicode

References 

Latin-script Unicode blocks
Unicode blocks